Katie Guay (born 1982) is an American ice hockey official, currently serving as a referee in the National Hockey League (NHL) and American Hockey League (AHL). A retired ice hockey forward, Guay played college ice hockey with the Brown Bears during 2001 to 2005 and was team captain for the 2004–05 season.

Officiating career
Guay took up officiating in 2006, shortly after graduating from Brown University. She has officiated at eight International Ice Hockey Federation tournaments, most notably the women's ice hockey tournament at the 2018 Winter Olympics.

In November 2014, Guay and Erin Blair became the first female officials to referee a Southern Professional Hockey League (SPHL) game – the same game in which Shannon Szabados became the first female goaltender to win a SPHL game, when the Columbus Cottonmouths defeated the Fayetteville FireAntz 5–4 in overtime.

Guay was one of the first four women to officiate at the NHL level, working in an NHL Prospect Tournament hosted by the Anaheim Ducks at Great Park Ice in Irvine, California during September 7 through 10, 2019.

Alongside Kelly Cooke, Kendall Hanley, and Kirsten Welsh, Guay served as an officiant for the Elite Women's 3-on-3 event at the 2020 National Hockey League All-Star Game at Enterprise Center in St. Louis.

References

External links 
 

Living people
1982 births
American ice hockey officials
American women's ice hockey forwards
Ice hockey people from Massachusetts
People from Westfield, Massachusetts
National Hockey League officials
Brown Bears women's ice hockey players
American women referees and umpires